Ihrig is a surname of German origin. According to the 2010 United States Census, Ihrig is the 22235th most common surname in the United States, belonging to 1160 individuals. Ihrig is most common among White (99.48%) individuals. People named Ihrig include:
Stefan Ihrig, historian
Sebestyén Ihrig-Farkas (b. 1994), Hungarian footballer
Tevin Ihrig, German footballer

References

German-language surnames